Pedro Ramírez (born 20 April 1939) is a Puerto Rican former sports shooter. He competed at the 1972 Summer Olympics and the 1976 Summer Olympics.

References

1939 births
Living people
Puerto Rican male sport shooters
Olympic shooters of Puerto Rico
Shooters at the 1972 Summer Olympics
Shooters at the 1976 Summer Olympics
Place of birth missing (living people)